Khaled Al Jarrah Al Sabah (born 1953) is a Kuwaiti lieutenant general, who retired from military services after being appointed as minister of defense to succeed retired Lt General Sheikh Ahmed Al Khaled Al Hamad Al Sabah in the post. He was deputy prime minister and minister of defense from 4 August 2013 to 11 December 2017. He also served as deputy prime minister and minister of interior from 11 December 2017 to 18 November 2019. He is a member of the ruling family of Kuwait, Al Sabah. In March 2021, the Kuwaiti ministerial court ordered his arrest and imprisonment, on charges of corruption.

Career
Sabah was appointed as the Chief of General Staff of the Kuwait Military Forces on 4 March 2012. He held the rank of lieutenant general and retired from the Kuwaiti Armed Forces. He was appointed deputy prime minister and minister of defense on 4 August 2013. He replaced Ahmad Al Khalid Al Sabah in both posts. In 2017 he assumed the role of minister of interior. 

In November 2019 he was dismissed after minister of defense Sheikh Nasser Sabah Al Ahmed Al Sabah filed a complaint with the Kuwaiti Attorney General alleging embezzlement of 240 million Kuwaiti dinars ($794.5 million) which had taken place during Khaled's tenure as minister of defense.

Controversy

Allegations of embezzlement of public funds
In November 2019, Kuwaiti Minister of Defense Sheikh Nasser Al Sabah filed a complaint with the Kuwaiti Attorney General regarding alleged embezzlement of Kuwaiti public funds held at the Kuwait military attaché office in London. Both Khaled Al Jarrah and Nasser Al Sabah were subsequently dismissed in their roles as minister of interior and minister of defense, respectively. The Public Prosecutor in turn referred the report to the ministerial court for investigation, which issued a gag order preventing Kuwaiti media from reporting on the case.

US Department of Justice asset forfeiture
In July 2020, US Department of Justice prosecutors alleged in an asset forfeiture filing that Khaled Al-Jarrah and two others  set up unauthorized accounts in the name of Kuwait's Military Attaché Office in London. They then allegedly funded these unauthorized accounts with tens of million of dollars, pounds, and Euros of Kuwaiti public money, and used it for their own purposes. According to U.S. prosecutors, Khaled Al-Jarrah transferred $104 million of the misappropriated Kuwaiti funds to California banks between 2012 and 2015, with some transfers falsely described as for Kuwaiti military purposes. The U.S. claims the money was also spent to buy The Mountain Beverly Hills, as well as a $6 million penthouse, and another $13 million Beverly Hills property, which the Justice Department is also attempting to seize. Victorino Noval and sons, as well as Samir El Mahallawy (who introduced Khaled to Noval) are named in the lawsuit alleging fraud.

Arrest and detention
In March 2021, the Kuwaiti ministerial court ordered the detention of Khaled Al Jarrah, who was arrested and imprisoned.

Lawsuits 
Al Sabah, known when he visited the U.S.,as "Fernando", is also well known in the US as a liltigant of multiple lawsuits that were engineered by his former partner, disbarred lawyer David Leonard Ross.  Ross was fired when he was caught stealilng a yacht,  claiming it was for Al Sabah's company, AWAL.   Case #  20STCV19934.

References

21st-century Kuwaiti politicians
1953 births
Defence ministers of Kuwait
Government ministers of Kuwait
Khaled
Lieutenant generals
Living people